Teplyaki is a rural locality (a selo) and the administrative center of Teplyakovsky Selsoviet, Burayevsky District, Bashkortostan, Russia. The population was 269 as of 2010. There are 5 streets.

Geography 
Teplyaki is located 28 km north of Burayevo (the district's administrative centre) by road. Asavtamak is the nearest rural locality.

References 

Rural localities in Burayevsky District